James John Rudd (2 September 1901 – 20 May 1996) was an Australian rules footballer who played with Footscray in the Victorian Football League (VFL).		

Rudd played for Port Melbourne for three and a half years before crossing to Footscray half way through their inaugural VFL season. He returned to Port Melbourne at the start of the following season.

Rudd later served in the Royal Australian Air Force during World War II.

Notes

External links 

Jimmy Rudd's playing statistics from The VFA Project

1901 births
1996 deaths
Australian rules footballers from Melbourne
Western Bulldogs players
Port Melbourne Football Club players
Royal Australian Air Force personnel of World War II
People from Williamstown, Victoria
Military personnel from Melbourne